New Hampshire Route 117 (abbreviated NH 117) is an  east–west highway in northern New Hampshire. NH 117 runs from Franconia to Lisbon in the White Mountains Region.

The eastern terminus of NH 117 is at New Hampshire Route 18 and New Hampshire Route 116 in Franconia, where NH 117 is named Sugar Hill Road. The western terminus of NH 117 is in Lisbon at U.S. Route 302 and New Hampshire Route 10.

Major intersections

References

External links

 New Hampshire State Route 117 on Flickr

117
Transportation in Grafton County, New Hampshire